Guglielmo De Sanctis (born 1897, date of death unknown) was an Italian diver. He competed in two events at the 1920 Summer Olympics.

References

External links
 

1897 births
Year of death missing
Italian male divers
Olympic divers of Italy
Divers at the 1920 Summer Olympics
Sportspeople from Trieste